Kennedia beckxiana, commonly known as Cape Arid kennedia, is a species of flowering plant in the family Fabaceae and is endemic to the south-west of Western Australia. It is a prostrate or twining shrub or a climber with trifoliate leaves and red and yellow, pea-like flowers.

Description
Kennedia beckxiana is a prostrate or twining shrub or a climber. Its leaves are trifoliate with stipules at the base of the petiole.

Taxonomy and naming
Kennedia beckxiana was first formally described in 1880 by Ferdinand von Mueller in Fragmenta phytographiae Australiae from specimens collected by William Webb near King George's Sound. The specific epithet (beckxiana) honours Gustav Beckx, a Belgian consul-general.

Distribution and habitat
Cape Arid kennedia grows on granite hills and outcrops in the Esperance Plains, Mallee and Swan Coastal Plain biogeographic regions of south-western Western Australia.

Conservation status
Kennedia beckxiana is classified as "Priority Four" by the Government of Western Australia Department of Biodiversity, Conservation and Attractions, meaning that is rare or near threatened.

References

beckxiana
Mirbelioids
Flora of Western Australia
Plants described in 1880
Taxa named by Ferdinand von Mueller